Cheryl's on 12th is a restaurant in Portland, Oregon, United States.

History
The restaurant is owned by Ed and Cheryl Casey and opened in 2012. In 2020, the restaurant closed temporarily because of the COVID-19 pandemic, but re-opened in late June.

References

External links

 
 

2012 establishments in Oregon
Restaurants established in 2012
Restaurants in Portland, Oregon
Southwest Portland, Oregon